Amac or AMAC may also refer to:
 Alternative macrophage activation-associated CC chemokine-1, the cytokine called CCL18
 Arlington Memorial Amphitheater Commission, which oversaw the design and construction of Arlington Memorial Amphitheater in Arlington, Virginia, United States  
Amac, the Hungarian name for Amaţi village, Păulești, Satu Mare, a commune in Romania
 A-MAC, carries digital information  on an FM subcarrier
 Ammonium acetate, a commonly used buffer in mobile phases for HPLC
 Abuja Municipal Area Council, the official name of Abuja's local government
 American Military Arms Corporation, parent company of Iver Johnson
 Asset Management Association of China, a Chinese association of fund management companies 
 Association of Mature American Citizens, a U.S. political action committee
 Aston Martin Asia Cup, a racing series 
 Atari Macro Assembler, software for Atari computers
 Atlantic Mediterranean Activities Conference, a sports league in Europe
 Iver Johnson AMAC-1500, a rifle